Darshan is an American Jewish alternative hip hop group from Brooklyn, New York. Formed in 2008 at the Isabella Freedman Jewish Retreat Center, the group primarily consists of rapper Eprhyme and singer-songwriters Shir Yaakov and Basya Schechter. Its debut album, Deeper and Higher, was released in 2015, followed by a second album, Raza, in 2017.

History 
The band's debut EP, Lishmah, originally released by Shemspeed Records on December 15, 2009, was re-released on January 5, 2010. The EP was produced by Shir Yaakov and engineered by Smoke M2D6 of Oldominion.

The group's first full-length album, Deeper and Higher, was released on September 29, 2015. It was produced by Jamie Saft and featured accompaniment by him, Ben Perowsky, and Basya Schechter of Pharaoh's Daughter.

Musical style 
In addition to hip hop, Darshan's music also contains elements of folk rock and the minor key melodies of traditional Jewish music. Ezra Glinter of The Forward notes that "Eprhyme's hard-driving lyrics are tempered and sweetened by Shir Yaakov’s more melody-driven sensibilities."

Discography

Albums
 Deeper and Higher (September 29, 2015; independent)
 Raza (November 1, 2017; Chant Records)

Extended plays
 Lishmah (December 15, 2009; re-released January 5, 2010; Shemspeed)

Music videos
 "Know Return" (2015; Deeper and Higher; dir. Ken Ross)
 "Aleph Bass" (2015; non-album single; dir. Brian Savelson and Abbey Luck)
 "Remember the Future" (2017; Deeper and Higher)
 "Hapax Legomenon" (2018; Raza; dir. Timslew and Eden Pearlstein)

References

External links 
 
 Official Facebook page

Jewish hip hop groups
Alternative hip hop groups
Musical groups established in 2008
Rappers from New York (state)
Shemspeed Records artists